Im Yong-su (born February 9, 1980) is a North Korean weightlifter. He won a gold medal in the men's 62 kg division at the 2002 World Weightlifting Championships in Warsaw, Poland, with a total of 315.0 kilograms. He also captured two silver medals at the Asian Games (2002 in Busan, South Korea, and 2006 in Doha, Qatar). Im competed for the same division at the 2000 Summer Olympics in Sydney, and at the 2004 Summer Olympics in Athens, but he neither completed the event, nor claimed an Olympic medal.

Eight years after competing in his first Olympics, Im qualified for the third time in the men's featherweight category (62 kg), as a 28-year-old, at the 2008 Summer Olympics in Beijing, by placing second from the 2007 World Weightlifting Championships in Chiang Mai, Thailand. Im, however, did not finish the event, as he successfully lifted 138 kg in the single-motion snatch, but failed to hoist 168 kg in the two-part, shoulder-to-overhead clean and jerk.

References

External links
NBC Olympics Profile

North Korean male weightlifters
1980 births
Living people
Olympic weightlifters of North Korea
Weightlifters at the 2000 Summer Olympics
Weightlifters at the 2004 Summer Olympics
Weightlifters at the 2008 Summer Olympics
Weightlifters at the 2002 Asian Games
Weightlifters at the 2006 Asian Games
Asian Games medalists in weightlifting
Asian Games silver medalists for North Korea
Asian Games bronze medalists for North Korea
Medalists at the 2002 Asian Games
Medalists at the 2006 Asian Games
World Weightlifting Championships medalists
21st-century North Korean people